Snežana Prorok (Serbian Cyrillic: Снежана Пророк, born 1994) is a Bosnian beauty pageant contestant from Istočna Ilidža, City of East Sarajevo, who won Miss Bosnia and Herzegovina 2010 title and previously won title Miss Republika Srpska 2010.

References

External links
Miss Bosnia and Herzegovina 2010
Snezana Prorok

1994 births
Miss World 2010 delegates
Serbs of Bosnia and Herzegovina
Living people
Bosnia and Herzegovina beauty pageant winners